Ochil was a constituency of the Scottish Parliament (Holyrood). It elected one Member of the Scottish Parliament (MSP) by the plurality (first past the post) method of election. Also, it was one of nine constituencies in the Mid Scotland and Fife electoral region, which elected seven additional members, in addition to the nine constituency MSPs, to produce a form of proportional representation for the region as a whole.

The former Presiding Officer of the Scottish Parliament George Reid represented the constituency from 2003 to 2007.

For the Scottish Parliament election, 2011, Ochil was abolished, with the majority of the seat forming the newly created Clackmannanshire and Dunblane seat.

Electoral region 

The region covers all of the Clackmannanshire council area, all of the Fife council area, all of the Perth and Kinross council area, all of the Stirling council area and parts of the Angus council area.

Constituency boundaries and council areas 

The  constituency was created at the same time as the Scottish Parliament, in 1999, with the name and boundaries of a pre-existing Westminster (House of Commons) constituency. In 2005, however, Scottish Westminster constituencies were mostly replaced with new constituencies. The Ochil Westminster constituency, was divided between the Ochil and South Perthshire Westminster constituency and the Stirling Westminster constituency.

From the Scottish Parliament election, 2011, Ochil was largely replaced by an expanded constituency of Clackmannanshire and Dunblane.

Constituency profile 

Although a county constituency, Ochil was mostly industrial in character, with the main industries of the region being brewing, distilling, glass manufacture, bottling, tourism and agriculture. There are however affluent areas, including Bridge of Allan, which is home to wealthy commuters to the city of Stirling and further afield; Dollar, which has, in its Academy, one of Scotland's most renowned private schools; and rural Kinross. The majority of the constituency's inhabitants, however, are working-class.

Member of the Scottish Parliament

Election results 

 

 
 
 
 
 
 
 

 
 
 
 

Note: Although George Reid was elected as a Scottish National Party candidate in 2003, he became independent the same year, as the Presiding Officer of the Scottish Parliament.

Footnotes 

Scottish Parliament constituencies and regions 1999–2011
1999 establishments in Scotland
Constituencies established in 1999
2011 disestablishments in Scotland
Constituencies disestablished in 2011
Politics of Clackmannanshire
Politics of Perth and Kinross
Alloa
Dollar, Clackmannanshire
Kinross
Tillicoultry
Clackmannan